Sabeen Gul Khan is a Pakistani politician who had been a member of the Provincial Assembly of the Punjab from August 2018 till January 2023.

Political career
She belongs to  Pakistan's Punjab province, North Punjab, from Multan district. Before MPA, she was District President Women on behalf of PTI in Multan in 2013. In 2016, she was selected as a member of the Municipal Corporation from district Multan. In 2018, she became a member of provincial assembly.
She was elected to the Provincial Assembly of the Punjab as a candidate of Pakistan Tehreek-e-Insaf (PTI) on a reserved seat for women in 2018 Pakistani general election.

References

External links
 Punjab Assembly | Members - Members' Directory

Living people
Punjabi people
Punjab MPAs 2018–2023
Pakistan Tehreek-e-Insaf MPAs (Punjab)
Year of birth missing (living people)
Women members of the Provincial Assembly of the Punjab
21st-century Pakistani women politicians